The STAMP is a  lightweight remote controlled weapon stations manufactured by Aselsan of Turkey. It can be fitted with either a 7.62 mm / 12.7 mm machine gun or a 40 mm automatic grenade launcher.

Overview
The system stabilizer allows gun to remain on target as the platform beneath it moves. The mounting does not penetrate the platform, making it relatively simple to fit the weapon to ships. It's modular  structure enables for upgrades and options according to customer needs. Similar to most other small caliber RCWS its electroptical suit is fixed with its gun. However, Aselsan made a upgraded variant STAMP-2 which has a surveillance mode with independently movable electroptical suit.

200 (12.7 mm) rounds are carried on the mounting inside magazine. The mount can traverse 360° when  elevate between -15° to +55°. The system can be used during day and night under various weather. There is also a manual operation mode as a back-up.

STAMP-G

Although the system is a variant of STAMP, it is mainly designed to fitted with 12.7 mm GAU-19/A three-barrel rotary heavy machine gun. It can also be fitted with either a 12.7 mm M2HB heavy machine gun, 7.62 mm FN Minimi light machine gun or a 40 mm MK 19 automatic grenade launcher. The system stabilizer allows gun to remain on target as the platform beneath it moves. The mounting does not penetrate the platform (except cables), making it relatively simple to fit the weapon to ships. It's modular  structure enables for upgrades and options according to customer needs. 500 (12.7 mm) rounds are carried on the mounting inside magazine. The mount can traverse 360° when  elevate between -15° to +55°. The system can be used during day and night under various weather. There is also a manual operation mode as a back-up.

References

Remote weapon stations
Aselsan products
Military equipment introduced in the 2010s